The South Side School in Geneseo, Illinois was built in 1889.  It was listed on the National Register of Historic Places in 1975.

It replaced "The American House" that served as a boarding house for out-of-town visitors from 1854. The South Side School was designed by architect John W. Ross and was built by Volk Construction Co. It was demolished, controversially, in 1979.

References

National Register of Historic Places in Henry County, Illinois
Romanesque Revival architecture in Illinois
School buildings completed in 1889
School buildings on the National Register of Historic Places in Illinois